Ron Hanna (born September 25, 1937) is an American politician. He served as a Democratic member for the 26th district of the Washington House of Representatives.

Life and career 
Hanna was born in Tacoma, Washington. He attended Pacific Lutheran University and the University of Washington.

In 1975, Hanna was elected to represent the 26th district of the Washington House of Representatives.

References 

1937 births
Living people
Politicians from Tacoma, Washington
Democratic Party members of the Washington House of Representatives
20th-century American politicians
Pacific Lutheran University alumni
University of Washington alumni